Benson's mabuya (Trachylepis bensonii) is a species of skink, a lizard in the family Scincidae. The species is native to Western Africa.

Etymology
The specific name, bensonii, is in honor of Stephen Allen Benson, who was President of Liberia from 1856 to 1864.

Geographic range
T. bensonii is found in Liberia and Sierra Leone.

Habitat

Reproduction
T. bensonii is oviparous.

References

Further reading
Bauer AM (2003). "On the identity of Lacerta punctata Linnaeus 1758, the type species of the genus Euprepis Wagler 1830, and the generic assignment of Afro-Malagasy skinks". African Journal of Herpetology 52 (1): 1–7. (Trachylepis bensonii, new combination).
Peters W (1867). "Herpetologische Notizen ". Monatsberichte der Königlich-Preussischen Akademie der Wissenschaften zu Berlin 1867: 13–37. ("Euprepes (Euprepis) Bensonii ", new species, pp. 20–21). (in German).
Trape J-F, Trape S, Chirio L (2012). Lézards, crocodiles et tortues d'Afrique occidentale et du Sahara. Paris: IRD Orstom. 503 pp. . (in French).

Trachylepis
Reptiles described in 1867
Taxa named by Wilhelm Peters